Toby  Hill (5 November 1915 – 22 January 1977) was a Scottish trade unionist and watersider.

Hill was born in Blantyre, South Lanarkshire, Scotland on 5 November 1915. He was heavily involved in the 1951 New Zealand waterfront dispute. He stood (unsuccessfully, like all Labour candidates) on the Labour ticket for both the Wellington City Council and Wellington Harbour Board in 1944.

References

1915 births
1977 deaths
New Zealand trade unionists
New Zealand sailors
Scottish emigrants to New Zealand
People from Blantyre, South Lanarkshire
New Zealand Labour Party politicians